Dowon Station is a station on Seoul Subway Line 1. It is on Gyeongin Line. It was opened in 1899 as Ugakdong Station, which was terminated from service in 1906. The station was reopened in 1994.

Vicinity
Exit 1: Incheon Football Stadium
Exit 2:

The JEI University is nearby.

References

Metro stations in Incheon
Seoul Metropolitan Subway stations
Dong District, Incheon
Michuhol District